The Flying Legend Tucano Replica is an Italian light-sport aircraft, designed and produced by Flying Legend of Caltagirone and introduced at the AERO Friedrichshafen show in 2011. The aircraft is supplied as a kit for amateur construction or as a complete ready-to-fly-aircraft.

Flying Legend is a collaborative project between MGA and Barum.

Design and development
The Tucano Replica is scale replica of the 1980s vintage Embraer EMB 312 Tucano turboprop trainer and features a cantilever low-wing, a two-seats-in-tandem enclosed cockpit under a bubble canopy, retractable tricycle landing gear and a single engine in tractor configuration. A fixed gear model has been developed for the US light sport aircraft market.

The aircraft is made from 2024-T3 aluminum and 6061-T6 aluminum sheet. Standard engines available are the  Rotax 912ULS four-stroke powerplant, with the  Rotax 914 and  D-Motor LF39 optional.

Specifications (Tucano Replica)

References

External links

Official website

Tucano
Homebuilt aircraft
Light-sport aircraft
Single-engined tractor aircraft
Low-wing aircraft
Replica aircraft